José Ariel Camacho Barraza (July 8, 1992 – February 25, 2015) was a Mexican musician who performed Regional Mexican music genre. He was the lead singer and lead guitarist of his group, Ariel Camacho y Los Plebes del Rancho. In 2013 Ariel Camacho y Los Plebes del Rancho signed to JG Records where they frequently played in Tijuana, Baja California, Mexico. In 2014 they signed with DEL Records, which allowed them to play their music in the United States

Life
Ariel Camacho was born to Benito Camacho and Reynalda Barraza on July 8, 1992 in Guamuchil, Sinaloa. He started playing the guitar at the age of 7 and singing at the age of 12.  He became known as "La Tuyia" due to a childhood nickname given to him by his grandfather because his guitar was much bigger than him. When he was in middle school, he met César Iván Sánchez, who played guitar and did back up vocals. Camacho later sought to expand his group and found a tuba player, Omar Burgos. His first concert was held in Tijuana, in which he played for more than 40,000 people. He quickly became known for his expressive way of playing the Requinto also known as a twelve-string guitar. Ariel’s preferred brand of guitar was the Takamine. He would play a P3DC-12 guitar. He decided to form a band in the start of 2013. His band Ariel Camacho y Los Plebes del Rancho consisted of "El Tigre", Cesar Sánchez who did rhythm guitar and backing vocals and “El Cenizo” Omar Burgos who played the sousaphone tuba. Camacho was the lead singer and played lead guitar in the band. His band quickly became known due to their outdated combination of standard guitar, 12-string guitar, and sousaphone  tuba. Among their most successful songs were "Hablemos", "Te Metiste", "El Karma" and "Rey de Corazones". He was later nicknamed "El Rey de Corazónes" after releasing "Rey de Corazones" a song that quickly made his group known through social media. Camacho was praised for maintaining a classical element in his regional music by paying attention to the songwriters who had come before him such as Miguel y Miguel, Camacho's favorite artists. He was also a frequent collaborator with other corrido singers, including Grupo Fernandez, Grupo Marca Registrada, Los Traviezoz de la Zierra and Regulo Caro.

Death
On February 25, 2015, 
Camacho and four other people were in a car accident on the road from Angostura, Sinaloa. Camacho was returning from a music festival, Carnaval de Mocorito. Camacho and two others died and two other people were injured. They were riding in a 2004 Honda Accord when Camacho lost control. The accident reportedly occurred at two in the morning on highway Angostura- La Reforma. Camacho died on impact. It is unclear whether he was driving intoxicated although it was reported he was driving at excessive speed. He died at the age of 22.

Legacy
Following his death, his group's song "El Karma" reached number one on the Billboard Hot Latin Songs chart in March and the album hit the TOP FIVE of the Latin albums chart. Shortly after his death, Ariel Camacho y Los Plebes del Rancho changed their name to Los Plebes del Rancho de Ariel Camacho to tribute Camacho. The band continues to make albums in honor of Camacho, like "Recuerden Mi Estilo", alongside Camacho's father, Benito Camacho. Many have paid tribute to Camacho through the use of songs such as Virlan Garcia with "Hasta el Cielo", Los Traviezoz de la Zierra with "Mis Ultimos Momentos" and "Un Mentado Ariel." An album in tribute to Camacho was also released in 2017 called "Ariel Camacho Para Siempre" that features artists such as Gerardo Ortiz, Regulo Caro, and Revolver Cannabis. Each year on the 25th of February in memory of Camacho, his band, family members, fans, and other artists come together at his grave to commemorate him. Ariel is now known by many as "El Rey del Requinto", "El Mentado", "Rey de Corazones" and "La Tuyia."

Discography
 Vivo Por Mi Música (2012)
 En Estudio Con Tuba (2013)
 El Rey de Corazones (2013) 
 El Karma (2014)
 Hablemos (2015)

References

1992 births
2015 deaths
Mexican male singer-songwriters
Mexican singer-songwriters
Musicians from Sinaloa
Norteño musicians
People from Guamúchil
Road incident deaths in Mexico
21st-century Mexican male singers
21st-century Mexican singers